"My Funny Valentine" is a song by Richard Rodgers and Lorenz Hart.

My Funny Valentine also refers to:

 My Funny Valentine (Miles Davis album)
 My Funny Valentine (Frederica von Stade album) 
 My Funny Valentine (Larry Willis album)
 "My Funny Valentine", an episode of the animated series Cowboy Bebop

See also
 Funny Valentine, an album by the experimental power trio Massacre
 Funny Valentines, a 1999 television film